Al Marqab is a village in Dhamar Governorate in western Yemen at 2754 m. elevation.

External links
 "Al Marqab, Yemen", Falling Rain Genomics, Inc.
 "Al Marqab" Maplandia.com

M